This page lists all described species of the spider family Ammoxenidae accepted by the World Spider Catalog :

Ammoxenus

Ammoxenus Simon, 1893
 A. amphalodes Dippenaar & Meyer, 1980 — South Africa
 A. coccineus Simon, 1893 (type) — Zambia, Namibia, Botswana, South Africa
 A. daedalus Dippenaar & Meyer, 1980 — South Africa
 A. kalaharicus Benoit, 1972 — Botswana, South Africa
 A. pentheri Simon, 1896 — Botswana, South Africa
 A. psammodromus Simon, 1910 — Namibia, Botswana, South Africa

Austrammo

Austrammo Platnick, 2002
 A. harveyi Platnick, 2002 — Australia (Western Australia, South Australia)
 A. hirsti Platnick, 2002 — Australia (South Australia, Tasmania)
 A. monteithi Platnick, 2002 (type) — Eastern Australia
 A. rossi Platnick, 2002 — Australia (Western Australia, Northern Territory)

Barrowammo

Barrowammo Platnick, 2002
 B. waldockae Platnick, 2002 (type) — Australia (Western Australia)

Rastellus

Rastellus Platnick & Griffin, 1990
 R. africanus Platnick & Griffin, 1990 (type) — Namibia, Botswana
 R. deserticola Haddad, 2003 — Namibia, South Africa
 R. florisbad Platnick & Griffin, 1990 — South Africa
 R. kariba Platnick & Griffin, 1990 — Botswana, Zimbabwe, South Africa
 R. narubis Platnick & Griffin, 1990 — Namibia
 R. sabulosus Platnick & Griffin, 1990 — Namibia
 R. struthio Platnick & Griffin, 1990 — Namibia, Botswana

References

Ammoxenidae